A Love Story is the debut studio album by American singer Vivian Green. It was released by Columbia Records on November 12, 2002 in the United States. Green worked with a variety of producers on the album, including Anthony Bell, Junius Bervine, Durrell Bottoms, Jamar Jones, Fred Kenney, Osunlade, and Thaddeus Tribbett II. The album debuted at 93 on the US Billboard 200 in December 2002 and later peaked at number 51, also reaching number 13 on the Top R&B/Hip-Hop Albums. It was eventually certified gold by the Recording Industry Association of America.

Received to mixed reviews from music critics, A Love Story garnered Green three Lady of Soul Awards nominations for Best Solo R&B/Soul Single ("Emotional Rollercoaster"), Best Solo R&B/Soul Album of the Year, and Best Solo R&B/Solo or Rap New Artist, also earning a BET Award nomination for Best R&B Female Artist: 
The album spawned three singles including the US Billboard Hot 100 top 40 hit "Emotional Rollercoaster"; the Fred Kenney-produced "Fanatic" and the Osunlade-produced "What Is Love?". 

In 2020, during an interview about her seventh album Love Absolute, Green revealed A Love Story was her least favorite album - despite being well received by her fans.

Critical reception

Jack Smith from BBC Music called the album "a stunning and sublime debut." He wrote that A Love Story "is an inspired blend of seductive neo-soul coupled with a vocal maturity and emotional range of a young woman who's seen lifes up-and-downs." Allmusic editor William Ruhlmann wrote that "a group of producers provide familiar instrumental beds to support those sentiments, nothing that hasn't been heard before [...] Maybe consumers are ready to accept yet another singer in this style, but even so, on her debut album, Green is far from the most compelling of the group." Billboard declared the album a "properly titled" set on which "at times, Green attempts to do too much."

Christian Hoard and Jon Caramanica, writing for Rolling Stone, felt that "the debut from the sexy, dulcet-voiced twenty-three-year-old is all about neosoul politesse – hip-hop-flavored and vaguely jazzy. Very good if that's your thing, but tofu-bland otherwise." PopMatters critic J. Victoria Sanders remarked that "up-tempo is not Green's forte for a number of reasons. Mostly because her voice has more jazz in it than hip-hop, and she doesn't do well posing [...] Vivian Green's voice makes this journey through her heartbreak hotel worth the tour, but at the end of her girl meets boy story there's just too much left out of A Love Story to make it noteworthy."

Chart performance
A Love Story debuted at number 93 on the US Billboard 200 in December 2002. The album later peaked at number 51 on the same chart and reached number 18 on Billboards Top R&B/Hip Hop Albums in the week ending March 1, 2003 due to consistent sales. The album was certified gold by Recording Industry Association of America (RIAA) on May 6, 2003, indicating sales in excess of 500,000 copies, and stayed on the Billboard 200 chart for consecutive 27 weeks. A Love Story has sold over 531,000 copies in the US alone, according to Nielsen Soundscan.

The first single from the album, "Emotional Rollercoaster", peaked at number 39 on the US Billboard Hot 100 and at number 13 on the Hot R&B/Hip-Hop Songs. The song also went to number 1 on the Dance Club Songs chart. Second single "Fanatic" peaked at number 52 on the Hot R&B/Hip-Hop Songs chart, while third single "What Is Love?" also appeared on the Hot R&B/Hip-Hop Songs chart, reaching number 75.

Track listingSample credits'
"What Is Love?" contains replayes elements from "It Happens Everyday" as performed by Joe Sample.
"Complete" contains replayed elements from "A Few More Kisses to Go" as performed by Isaac Hayes.

Personnel

Terence J. Price -Keyboards background vocals, Producer (addicted)
Davis A. Barnett – Viola
Diane Barnett – Violin
Lynne Beiler – Cello
Anthony Bell – Keyboards, Producer, Engineer, Instrumentation
Damen Bennett – Flute
Junius Bervine – Keyboards, Vocals (background), Producer, String Arrangements, Instrumentation
Durrell Bottoms – Producer, Engineer
Jeff Bradshaw – Trombone
Alice Butts – Art Direction, Design
Thom Cadley – Surround Mix
Chauncey Childs – Executive Producer
Timothy Day – Guitar, Engineer
Omar Edwards – Organ
Russell Elevado – Mixing
Michael Fossenkemper – Mixing
Larry Gold – String Arrangements
Vivian Green – Vocals (background), Producer
Stephen Groat – Bass
Derrick Hodge – Bass
Jamar Jones – Piano, Producer
Ben Kenney – Guitar
Fred Kenney – Programming, Producer
Olga Konopelsky – Violin
Charlene Kwas – Violin
Oliver Gene Lake Jr. – Drums
Alexandra Leem – Viola
Jennie Lorenzo – Cello
Jonathan Maron – Bass
Carlos "Storm" Martinez – Engineer
George "Spanky" McCurdy – Drums
Shinobu Mitsuoka – Mixing Assistant
Ryan Moys – Engineer
Osunlade – Producer, Instrumentation
Pino Palladino – Bass
Kevin Patrick – A&R
Federico Gonzalez Peña – Keyboards
Bill Phelps – Photography
Isaac Phillips – Guitar
James Poyser – Percussion, Drums, Keyboards
Tony Prendatt – Engineer, Mixing
Darcy Proper – Surround Mix
Eric Roberson – Vocals (background), Engineer
"Little" John Roberts – Drums
Frank Romano – Guitar
Erik Sayles – Guitar (Acoustic), Guitar
David Schneider – Oboe
Clayton Sears – Guitar
Chris Stevens – Trumpet
Igor Szwec – Violin
Gregory Teperman – Violin
Alex Theoret – Mixing Assistant
Eric Tribbett – Drums, Producer
Thaddeus T. Tribbett – Bass
Tye Tribbett – Piano, Keyboards, Producer, Instrumentation
Steef Van De Gevel – Mixing Assistant

Charts

Weekly charts

Year-end charts

Certifications

References

External links
 
 

2002 debut albums
Columbia Records albums
Vivian Green albums